Nikolai Aleksandrovich Averyanov (born 27 November 1989) is a former Russian professional football player.

Club career
He played in the Russian Football National League for FC Dynamo Saint Petersburg in 2010.

External links
 
 

1989 births
Living people
Russian footballers
Association football midfielders
FC Orenburg players
FC Dynamo Saint Petersburg players
FC Oryol players
FC Znamya Truda Orekhovo-Zuyevo players